Henning Grieneisen (born 9 September 1984) is a German former professional footballer who played as a midfielder.

Career
Grieneisen made his debut on the professional league level in the Bundesliga for Arminia Bielefeld on 28 September 2004 when he came on as a substitute in the 90th minute in a game against Hannover 96.

References

External links
 
 

1984 births
Living people
People from Bad Arolsen
Sportspeople from Kassel (region)
Footballers from Hesse
Association football midfielders
German footballers
Arminia Bielefeld players
Holstein Kiel players
VfL Osnabrück players
SV Werder Bremen II players
Sportfreunde Lotte players
Bundesliga players
2. Bundesliga players
3. Liga players
German football managers
Sportfreunde Lotte managers